Robert Richard Irons (born November 19, 1946) is a former National Hockey League and International Hockey League goaltender. He was born in Toronto, Ontario. He played for two minutes and 59 seconds of one game in the NHL with the St. Louis Blues during the 1968–69 season. This occurred only because the Blues' starting goaltender, Glenn Hall, was ejected from a game before his replacement, Jacques Plante, was prepared to enter. Irons tended the net until Plante was able to take over.

Irons shared with Christian Soucy the NHL record for the fewest career minutes by a goaltender. He was surpassed on December 31, 2016 when Jorge Alves played 7.6 seconds in his only NHL game.

Irons played 11 seasons in the IHL with the Fort Wayne Komets, earning six selections to the All-Star team. His jersey number 30 is retired by the team.

Broadcasting career
After he retired as an active player, Irons went on to a long-time career as an analyst with the Komets' legendary play-by-play announcer, Bob Chase.  Chase and Irons were a team that stayed together for 33 years before Chase's death in 2016.

See also
List of players who played only one game in the NHL

References

External links
 
 Robbie Irons @ hockeygoalies.org

1946 births
Living people
Canadian ice hockey goaltenders
Fort Wayne Komets players
Ice hockey people from Toronto
Kansas City Blues players
Kitchener Rangers players
St. Louis Blues players